Sofija (Cyrillic: Софија) is a predominantly Latvian, Lithuanian and Serbian feminine given name. It is a cognate of the name Sophia meaning "Wisdom".  People bearing the name Sofija include:
Sofija Jovanović (1895–1979), Serbian war hero
Sofija Korkutytė (1939–2000), Lithuanian rower
Sofija Milošević (born 1990), Serbian model
Sofija Pšibiliauskienė (1867–1926), Lithuanian sister writer
Sofija Skoric (born 19??), Serbian-Canadian writer, editor, translator, publisher and activist
Sofija Smetonienė 1885–1968), former First Lady of Lithuania
Sofija Veiverytė (1926–2009), Lithuanian painter

References

Latvian feminine given names
Lithuanian feminine given names
Serbian feminine given names